Ailuropoda baconi is an extinct panda known from cave deposits in south China, Laos, Vietnam, Myanmar and Thailand from the Late Pleistocene, 750 thousand years ago, and was preceded by A. wulingshanensis and A. microta as an ancestor of the giant panda (A. melanoleuca). Very little is known about this animal; however, its latest fossils have been dated to the Late Pleistocene.

A. baconi is the largest panda ancestor on record and was larger than its descendant.

References

Pleistocene carnivorans
Giant pandas
Fossil taxa described in 1915
Prehistoric animals of China